Otto Roquette (April 19, 1824 – March 18, 1896) was a German author.

Life and work
Roquette was born in Krotoschin, Prussian Province of Posen. The son of a district court councillor, he first went to Bromberg (modern Bydgoszcz) in 1834, and from 1846 to 1850 studied Philology and History in Heidelberg, Berlin, and Halle. After tours in Switzerland and Italy, he moved to in Berlin in 1852. He became a teacher in Dresden in 1853. He returned to Berlin in 1857 and in 1862 became a professor of literary history at the War Academy until he changed to the Vocational Academy (now the Berlin Institute of Technology) in 1867. In 1868 he joined the Vandalia-Teutonia Berlin. From 1869 he taught at the Polytechnic in Darmstadt (now TU Darmstadt). In 1893 he was named to the Geheimrat. Roquette befriended the German author Paul Heyse and, like Heyse, was a member of the literary group "Rütli".

Roquette's pseudo-romantic and epigonic lyric poetry and his fairy tale-laden epic verse is representative of Butzenscheibenlyric. From 1850 on, his works were extremely popular and especially beloved in conservative circles. His fashionable post-revolution poetry was a deliberate departure from the politically tinged verse of the pre-March era. His celebrated verse-epic on themes of love, wine, and youth, Waldmeisters Brautfahrt, first appeared in 1851 and enjoyed sensational success for a book at that time – appearing in more than 50 editions over thirty years.

Roquette's work was popular with some Lieder composers, such as Pauline Volkstein. His 1851 poem Noch ist die blühende, goldene Zeit was fit to a well-known folk tune in 1863 by the musician Wilhelm Baumgartner. Roquette was also a novelist, playwright, literary historian and autobiographer

Roquette died in Darmstadt. Later generations found Roquette's work to be predominantly shallow and of little artistic value, and it is virtually forgotten today.

Works 
 1850: Walpurgis
 1851: Orion
 1851: Waldmeisters Brautfahrt (Verse-Epic)
 1852: Liederbuch (under the title "Poems" 1859)
 1852: Der Tag von St. Jakob
 1853: Das Reich der Träume
 1854: Herr Heinrich
 1855: Haus Haidekuckuck (Verse-Epic)
 1855: Das Hünengrab
 1858: Heinrich Falk (Novel)
 1959: Erzählungen
 1860: Leben und Dichten Johann Christian Günther's (Scholarly work, biography)
 1862: Neue Erzählungen
 1864: Susanne
 1866: Die Legende von der heiligen Elisabeth (Libretto to an Oratorio by Franz Liszt)
 1867: Luginsland
 1867: Pierrot
 1867–76: Dramatische Dichtungen
 1868: Krachmost
 1869: Das Paradies
 1870: Novellen
 1871–75: Welt und Haus (Novella)
 1873: Gevatter Tod
 1873: Rhampsinit
 1873: Die Schlangenkönigin
 1877: Euphrosyne (Novel)
 1878: Das Buchstabirbuch der Leidenschaft (Novel)
 1878: Im Hause der Väter (Novel)
 1879: Geschichte der Deutschen Dichtung von den ältesten Denkmälern bis auf die Neuzeit (Scholarly work, literary History)
 1879: Die Prophetenschule (Novel)
 1883: Friedrich Preller
 1884: Neues Novellenbuch
 1884: Das Haus Eberhard
 1884: Unterwegs
 1884: Tage des Waldlebens
 1884: Baum im Odenwald
 1887: Große und kleine Leute in Alt-Weimar
 1890: Frühlingsstimmen
 1890: Des Lebens Mummenschanz
 1892: Ul von Haslach
 1894: Siebzig Jahre (Autobiography)
 1895: Sonderlinge
 1896: Krethi und Plethi
 1896: Von Tag zu Tage (posthumous)

References 

Ludwig Julius Fränkel: Roquette, Otto. In: Allgemeine Deutsche Biographie (ADB). Volume 53, Duncker & Humblot, Leipzig 1907, pp. 469–478.
Ursula Perkow: Wie Otto Roquette zum Dichter wurde. Mit Waldmeister aus Handschuhsheim auf dem Weg zum Ruhm. In: Jahrbuch des Stadtteilvereins Handschuhsheim, Heidelberg 1997, pp. 88–95 (Internet-Ausgabe)

External links 
 
 
 

1824 births
1896 deaths
People from Krotoszyn
People from the Province of Posen
German male writers